P2V can refer to:

 Lockheed P-2 Neptune
 Physical-to-Virtual